The MK14 (Microcomputer Kit 14) was a computer kit sold by Science of Cambridge of the United Kingdom, first introduced in 1977 for £39.95. The price was very low for a complete computer system at the time, and Science of Cambridge eventually sold over fifteen thousand kits.

History

In 1977, Ian Williamson approached Clive Sinclair and Chris Curry with a computer design based around the National Semiconductor SC/MP processor. Sinclair and Curry both liked the idea and saw the potential of making a low cost microprocessor system available to the hobbyist market. Initially it was planned to market a kit based on the Williamson design. However, after National Semiconductor had been contacted regarding a bulk purchase of the SC/MP processor Sinclair and Curry decided to use the chip manufacturer's own design. This design used all National Semiconductor chips and the company allowed the use of its designs, the SC/MP Introkit and Keyboard Kit, for free. The National Semiconductor SCMPKB Monitor code was included. 

To keep costs low a membrane keypad was used. The size of the initial batch was two thousand. The company sold between fifteen and fifty thousand in total.

Specification
The computer is based around National Semiconductor's SC/MP CPU (INS8060) and shipped with 256 bytes of random access memory (RAM) and 512 bytes of read only memory (ROM) as standard. It used an eight or nine red light-emitting diode (LED) seven segment display, there was also optional VDU supporting 32×16 text or 64×64 graphics. Input and output was a 20-key keyboard and reset switch. Cassette-based and PROM storage were optional extras; a sound card was not included but a design for one was provided.  

The on-board RAM could be increased in two ways; by the addition of an INS8154N RAM/IO chip providing an additional 128 bytes of RAM along with 16 I/O lines, and also a further 256 bytes by adding two 256 × 4 bit RAM chips giving a maximum of 640 bytes on board.  These memory spaces were not contiguous in the memory map.  It was possible to connect off-board RAM giving a 2170 bytes total.

The MK14 could address up to 64 KB of memory space by adding a few chips (the NADS address strobe indicated when the most significant four bits of address were available to be captured by an external latch); many pioneering homebrew computer magazines such as Personal Computer World, and Practical Electronics carried details of user modifications.

See also
 Microprocessor development board

Notes

External links
 Old-computers.com dedicated page, article, pictures, documents and videos

 MK14 manual
 The Sinclair / Science of Cambridge MK14 Web Site, includes emulator software
 Making a reproduction MK14 – includes original manuals/schematics

   Notes and links
              MK14 emulation in JavaScript

Computer-related introductions in 1977
Home computers
Single-board computers
Early microcomputers
Sinclair computers and derivatives